Alacahöyük or Alaca Höyük (sometimes also spelled as Alacahüyük, Euyuk, or Evuk) is the site of a Neolithic and Hittite settlement and is an important archaeological site. It is situated near the village of Alacahüyük in the Alaca District of Çorum Province, Turkey, northeast of Boğazkale (formerly and more familiarly Boğazköy), where the ancient capital city Hattusa of the Hittite Empire was situated. Its Hittite name is unknown: connections with Arinna, Tawiniya, and Zippalanda have all been suggested.

History

The mound (Turkish höyük) at Alacahöyük was a scene of settlement in a continuous sequence of development from the Chalcolithic Age, when earliest copper tools appeared alongside the use of stone tools.

Bronze Age
During the Early Bronze Age, the mound was the center of a flourishing culture. It has been continuously occupied ever since, until today's modern settlement in the form of a small village. The standing and distinguishing remains at Alacahöyük, however, such as the "Sphinx Gate", date from the Hittite period that followed the Hatti, from the fourteenth century BC.

Fourteen shaft-grave "Royal Tombs" (2850–2450 BC) date to the same period as the Royal Tombs of Ur and the Troy excavation level II. The tombs of typical shaft design, about 1.5 meters in depth, sealed by wooden beams, They contained the dead with folded legs facing west. The heads and legs of bulls were placed on platforms and the dead were richly adorned with gold fibulae, diadems, and belt buckles and repoussé gold-leaf figures. Seven metal figurines were found in the tombs with four being made of bronze and 3 of silver.

Tomb H - (8 meters by 3.4 meters), female. Contents included "a golden diadem, two copper mace heads, a bronze sun standard, the statuette of an animal, small ornaments made of gold and silver, vessels made of gold and clay, metal artefacts, two axes, five pairs of twin idols made of gold, and three female figurines".

Tombs A - (5 meters by 2.3 meters), adult female. Besides a golden diadem contents included "four sun standards, an animal statuette, several metal ornaments, pieces of an iron object, and two metal anthropomorphic figurines ".

Many of the artefacts discovered at Alacahöyük, including magnificent gold and bronze objects found in the Royal Tombs, are housed today in the Museum of Anatolian Civilizations in Ankara. Among these artefacts are gold and electrum standing cups and other vessels. The most unusual are the Alaca Höyük bronze standards; bulls or stags on pedestals whose purpose remains the subject of debate. The standards are cast in copper, many in the form of flat circles, half-circles or squares that are filled with an openwork network of cross bars, central crosses, and swastikas. Leonard Woolley found that the Royal Tombs "seem to belong to the end of a period, as marked by a stratum of destruction and the burning of the citadel. The culture which the tomb objects illustrate does not continue into the next historical phase, that of Kültepe". Modern assessment finds that the site continued as a flourishing community to the end of the Late Bronze Age. There was also a sizable occupation in Phrygian times.

Dams

A dam, dating from 1240 BC, was announced to be reopened for use on September 23, 2006. The dam was ordered by King Tudhaliya IV in the name of the goddess Hebat. According to ancient Hittite tablets, a drought struck Anatolia in 1200 BC, prompting the King to import wheat from Egypt so that his land would avoid famine. Following this, the king ordered numerous dams to be built in central Anatolia, all but one of them becoming non-functional over time. The one in Alacahöyük has survived because the water source is located inside the dam's reservoir.

Archaeology

The site measures 310 meters by 275 meters with a height of about 14 meters. The mound features cone like rises at the south and northeast ends. It has 14 occupational layers with 9-14 being Chalcolithic, 5-8 being Early Bronze Age (royal tombs), and 2-4 being Hittite. The uppermost layer shows elements of  Phrygian, Roman, and Ottoman times. The site was probed by George
Perrot and Ernest Chantre in the late 1800s and drawings of the remains published. In 1907, the Ottoman archaeologist Theodor Makridi Bey carried out brief explorations here for two weeks.  In the 1910s, German teams discovered royal tombs dating to the third millennium BC, as well as a Hittite town of the second millennium BC. The impressive sphinx gate surrounded by stone reliefs marked its entrance.
 
The town was heavily fortified with walls and towers due to the frequent raids of the Kaska people living in the mountainous region to the north.
Excavations by the Turkish archaeologists Remzi Oğuz Arık and Hamit Koşay resumed in 1935 under the personal instructions of Atatürk who contributed from his own budget. 
 In 1968 the work was under the direction of  Mahmut A. The work, which continued until 1970, revealed considerable local wealth and achievement even before the time of the Hittites, with the earliest occupation dating from the 4th millennium BC. Tombs of the 3rd millennium BC feature metal vessels, jewelry, weapons, and pole finials of bulls, stags, as well as abstract forms often interpreted as solar symbols. Excavation at the site resumed in 1994, and is now directed by Dr. Aykut Çınaroğlu.

In the excavations of 2002, 2003 and 2005, four new hieroglyphic Luwian documents were uncovered, a clay sealing, two vessels with seal impressions, and a stele fragment.

See also

Alishar Hüyük
Cities of the ancient Near East

Notes

References
Remzi Oguz Arik, Les Fouilles d'Alaca Höyük: Entreprises par la société d'histoire turque. Rapport preliminaire sur les travaux en 1935, Publications de la Société Turque, 1937
Bachhuber, C. 2011. Negotiating Metal and Metal Form in the Royal Tombs of Alacahöyük in North-Central Anatolia. Pp. 158–74 in Interweaving Worlds: Systematic Interactions in Eurasia, 7th to the 1st Millennia BC, ed. T. C. Wilkinson, S. Sherratt, and J. Bennet. Oxford: Oxbow
Ayse Gursan-Salzmann, Alaca Hoyuk: A reassessment of the excavation and sequence of the Early Bronze Age settlement, University of Pennsylvania, 1992
Korfmann, M. 1981. Die “Große Göttin” in Alaca Höyük. Pp. 153–65 and pls. 97–102 in IX. Türk Tarih Kongresi: Ankara, 21-25 Eylül 1981: Kongreye sunulan bildiriler. Ankara: Türk Tarih Kurumu
Hamit Z. Koşay and Mahmut Akok, The Pottery of Alaca Höyük, American Journal of Archaeology, vol. 51, no. 2, pp. 152–157, 1947
 The Art of The Middle East, including Persia, Mesopotamia and Palestine - Woolley
M. J. Mellink, Observations on the Sculptures of Alaca Hoyuk, Anatolia, vol. 14, pp. 15–27, 1970
 Ahmet Unal, The Textual Illustration of the Jester Scene on the Sculptures of Alaca Höyük, Anatolian Studies, vol. 44, pp. 207–218, 1994
O.R Gurney, The Ladder-Men at Alaca Höyük, Anatolia Studies, vol. 44, pp. 219–220, 1994
Piotr Taracha, The Iconographic Program of the Sculptures of Alacahöyük, Journal of Ancient Near Eastern Religions, vol. 11, iss. 2, pp. 132–147, 2011

External links

 Images from Alacahöyük
 Republic of Turkey web site for Alacahöyük
 "Hittite culture survives in Alacahöyük" - Hürriyet Daily News

Çorum
Archaeological sites of prehistoric Anatolia
Hittite sites in Turkey
Hittite cities
National parks of Turkey
Former populated places in Turkey
Archaeological sites in the Black Sea Region
Geography of Çorum Province
History of Çorum Province
Buildings and structures in Çorum Province